Martin Peak is a mountain summit in the Olympic Mountains and is located in Jefferson County of Washington state. It is located within Olympic National Park. Its nearest higher neighbor is Mount Johnson,  to the north-northwest. Precipitation runoff from this peak drains west into headwaters of Gray Wolf River, or east into Royal Creek, both of which are part of the Dungeness River drainage basin. Martin Peak was given its name based on the first ascent in 1940 by George W. Martin (1901–1970), and Elvin Johnson.

Climate
 
Martin Peak is located in the marine west coast climate zone of western North America. Most weather fronts originate in the Pacific Ocean, and travel northeast toward the Olympic Mountains. As fronts approach, they are forced upward by the peaks of the Olympic Range, causing them to drop their moisture in the form of rain or snowfall (Orographic lift). As a result, the Olympics experience high precipitation, especially during the winter months in the form of snowfall. During winter months, weather is usually cloudy, but, due to high pressure systems over the Pacific Ocean that intensify during summer months, there is often little or no cloud cover during the summer. Because of maritime influence, snow tends to be wet and heavy, resulting in avalanche danger. However, Martin's location puts it in the rain shadow of the Olympic Range, resulting in less precipitation than Mount Olympus and the western Olympics receive. The months July through September offer the most favorable weather for viewing and climbing this peak.

Geology

The Olympic Mountains are composed of obducted clastic wedge material and oceanic crust, primarily Eocene sandstone, turbidite, and basaltic oceanic crust. The mountains were sculpted during the Pleistocene era by erosion and glaciers advancing and retreating multiple times.

See also

 Gray Wolf Ridge
 Geology of the Pacific Northwest
 Mount Deception

References

Gallery

External links
 George W. Martin biography: americanalpineclub
 
 National Weather Service: weather forecast

Mountains of Washington (state)
Olympic Mountains
Mountains of Jefferson County, Washington
Landforms of Olympic National Park
North American 2000 m summits